X Factor is an Albanian television music competition to find new singing talents. The fourth season began on 5 January on TV Klan.

The auditions were broadcast in January, when the show started airing. The show was hosted once again by Albanian singer Alketa Vejsiu, while the judging panel this year consisted of Bleona Qereti, Alban Skenderaj, Miriam Cani and Pandi Laço.

The other differences this year, was that there was a variety of contestants who come from different places. Manuel Moscati, Ylenia Iorio and Matteo Brento were from Italy. There was a soloist from Macedonia, Alice, this year. There was a soloist from Kosovo, Floriana Rexhepi, this year too.

Judges' houses

The 14 eliminated acts were:
 Boys: Algert Sala, Arnold Kallaci, Drilon Jahdauti, Fisnik Fetahu
 Girls: Aiola Laska, Ensuida Gjergji, Oresta Dibra, Xhulia Ziri
 Over 23s: Ana Ndini, Erlisa Shena, Leotrim Gervalla, Megi Karavani
 Groups: Duo, No Name

Contestants
The top 16 Contestants were confirmed as follows;

Key:
 – Winner
 – Runner-up
 – Third place

Live Shows

Results summary 

Color key

Live show details

Week 1 (23 February 2015) 

Judges' votes to eliminate
 Alban Skënderaj: Genti Deda
 Bleona Qereti: Adela Curra
 Miriam Cani: Adela Curra
 Pandi Laço: Adela Curra

Week 2 (2 March 2015) 

Judges' votes to eliminate
 Miriam Cani: Mama Pop
 Pandi Laço: Floriana Rexhepi
 Alban Skënderaj: Mama Pop
 Bleona Qereti: Mama Pop

Week 3 (9 March 2015) 

Judges' votes to eliminate
 Miriam Cani: Ylenia Iorio
 Pandi Laço: Ylenia Iorio
 Alban Skënderaj: Lediana Matoshi
 Bleona Qereti: Ylenia Iorio

Week 4 (16 March 2015) 

Judges' votes to eliminate
 Miriam Cani: X Roads
 Pandi Laço: Alice
 Alban Skënderaj: X Roads
 Bleona Qereti: X Roads

Week 5 (23 March 2015) 

Judges' votes to eliminate
 Miriam Cani: Matteo Brento
 Pandi Laço: Matteo Brento
 Alban Skënderaj: Mirela Boka
 Bleona Qereti: Mirela Boka

Week 6 (30 March 2015) 

Judges' votes to eliminate
 Miriam Cani: Igli Zarka
 Bleona Qereti: Lediana Matoshi
 Pandi Laço: Igli Zarka
 Alban Skënderaj: Igli Zarka

Week 7 (6 April 2015) 

Judges' votes to eliminate
 Miriam Cani: Manuel Moscati
 Pandi Laço: Lediana Matoshi
 Alban Skënderaj: Lediana Matoshi
 Bleona Qereti: Lediana Matoshi

Week 8 (13 April 2015) 

Judges' votes to eliminate
 Alban Skënderaj: Dilan Reka
 Bleona Qereti: Alice
 Miriam Cani: Alice
 Pandi Laço: Alice

Week 9 (20 April 2015) 

Judges' votes to eliminate
 Pandi Laço: Matteo Brento
 Miriam Cani: Brunetts
 Bleona Qereti: Brunetts
 Alban Skënderaj: Brunetts

Week 10 (27 April 2015) 

Judges' votes to eliminate
 Alban Skënderaj: Matteo Brento
 Bleona Qereti: Manuel Moscati
 Miriam Cani: Matteo Brento
 Pandi Laço: Matteo Brento

Week 11 (4 May 2015)

Week 12 (11 May 2015) 

Judges' votes to eliminate
 Alban Skënderaj: Floriana Rexhepi
 Miriam Cani: Manuel Moscati
 Bleona Qereti: Floriana Rexhepi
 Pandi Laço: Floriana Rexhepi

Week 13 (18 May 2015) 
 Musical guest: Elhaida Dani ("I'm Alive")

Judges' votes to eliminate
 Alban Skënderaj: Edea Demaliaj
 Miriam Cani: Manuel Moscati
 Pandi Laço: Manuel Moscati
 Bleona Qereti:  Manuel Moscati

X Factor (Albanian TV series)
2015 Albanian television seasons
Albania 04